Ndukaku Alison (born 12 August 1991) is a Nigerian professional footballer.

Career 

Alison spent most of his career playing in Finland playing for clubs RoPS and AC Kajaani. In 2016 he started playing for a club Chittagong Abahani Limited in Bangladesh. In 2018 Alison played in AFC Cup with Abahani Limited Dhaka scoring one goal during the Cup. In 2019 Alison continued his career in Bangladesh Premier League playing for Sheikh Russel KC. On 2 February 2021, Alison signed for FC Haka.

External links

References 

1991 births
Living people
Nigerian footballers
Association football defenders
Veikkausliiga players
Bangladesh Football Premier League players
Rovaniemen Palloseura players
AC Kajaani players
Nigerian expatriate footballers
Expatriate footballers in Finland
Expatriate footballers in Bangladesh